Coleophora crypsineura is a moth of the family Coleophoridae, first described by Oswald Bertram Lower in 1900 as Batrachedra crypsineura.

It is found in dry and semidry southern Australia from Coonabarabran, New South Wales to Caiguna in Western Australia.

References

External links
Australian Faunal Directory

Moths of Australia
crypsineura
Moths described in 1900